Saleem Beg   (Mohammad Saleem Beg) is an Indian art conservator, historian and columnist. He is working to conserve / preserve the artworks, architecture, archaeology, besides  museum collections mainly connected to Kashmir heritage.
He prepared the research dossier of  seven crafts  include papier-mache, pashmina, Khatamband, Woodwork, Pinjrakari (latticework), Ari and Metal craft  which  placed the Srinagar city of Jammu and Kashmir in the list of UNESCO creative cities network for 2021, in the field of  craft and folk art.

Early life
Mohammad Saleem Beg was born  in 1949 in Srinagar , the summer capital of Jammu and Kashmir. He was educated at the Gandhi Memorial College and  University of Kashmir. 

After studies, Beg joined government service in the year 1975 and retired after rendering 31 years of public service as the Director General of Tourism, Government of Jammu and Kashmir. Since 2006 he is convener of the Indian National Trust for Art and Cultural Heritage – INTACH, J&K Chapter.

Awards and recognition
For his contribution in preserving, documenting and dissemination of  the ethno cultura heritage of  Kashmir,  Beg  won the highest State Award in 2017 from the Government of Jammu and Kashmir. He was awarded an EEC fellowship in 1998. Besides, he has been awarded by a number of Universities, NGOs for his outstanding work in the field of research and documentation.

Work and Contribution
In 2013,  Beg was appointed as a member of the organisation of India -  National Monument Authority (NMA), Government of India where he served for five year.
As a conservator-restorer his documentation work has provided a base to declare Srinagar among 49 cities as part of the creative city network by the United Nations Educational, Scientific and Cultural Organization (UNESCO) under the Crafts and Folk Arts category in 2021.

Restoration of past glory  of Mughal era camel hump-shaped Oont Kadal in middle of Dal Lake  and Aali Masjid an Architecture of 15th Century and Thag Baab Sahib (RA) shrine in Srinagar District of Jammu and Kashmir  was done by him.

External links
 Indian National Trust for Art and Cultural Heritage org. website
 National Monuments Authority Ministry of Culture, Government of India org. website
 UNESCO -World Heritage List org. website

See also
 Shujaat Bukhari
 Javaid Rahi

References 

Living people
People from Jammu and Kashmir
1949 births
University of Kashmir alumni
Writers from Jammu and Kashmir
Scholars from Jammu and Kashmir
University of Kashmir